0.TO.10 was the tenth concert tour by South Korean boy band Big Bang that was held to celebrate the group's tenth anniversary. The tour visited Japan, South Korea and Hong Kong from July 2016 to January 2017. The shows were live-streamed through theatres in Japan, Tencent QQ in China and Naver's V app. BigBang held 24 concerts in six cities, which attracted more than 1.1 million fans.

History

Japan 
In March 2016, it was announced that BigBang will hold a series of special 10th anniversary concerts in Yanmar Stadium Nagai in Osaka, with two shows to be held on July 30 and 31, with 110,000 fans in attendance. More than 450,000 people applied for the tickets, which lead to a third show being added on July 29. The concert on July 30 aired live through 148 theaters across Japan's 47 prefectures. A total of 165,000 tickets were sold from the three sold-out shows.

On July 28, YG announced a fourth Japan dome tour by the group. They broke their own record by being the first foreign act to hold a Japanese dome tour for four consecutive years. Due to overwhelming demand, three shows were added at Kyocera Dome as encore concerts, to bring the total expected attendance to 781,500 fans. On September 7, YGEX announced that the tour is the final project of their 0.TO.10 celebrations. Over 1 million fans applied for the tickets.

The concerts made BigBang the act with the biggest concert mobilization power for the year in Japan, the first time a non-Japanese act has topped the list.

South Korea 
In June 2016, a concert in South Korea was announced to be held on August 20 at Seoul World Cup Stadium in Seoul, marking the 10th anniversary of the group's debut. The tickets were available on July 14 on Auction, with all available tickets sold out in under 30 minutes. On July 18, a portion of the tickets were opened for fans in China, and all tickets sold out in nine minutes, with total log-ins posting 1.98 million with maximum simultaneous log-ins of 1.58 million on Weying's ticket-selling platform. After the huge demand for the tickets, 5,000 additional seats were added despite the poor view. The concert attracted 65,000 fans and became the biggest audience ever for a solo concert in the South Korea.

The paid live-stream of the concert was available through China's online platform Tencent, and Naver's V app in Korea. As of August 24, The total people streaming the concert was over 3 million.

The concert generated over 10 billion won in revenue ($8.8 million).

Encore concerts were announced to be held on January 7 and 8 of 2017 at the Gocheok Sky Dome.

Fan-meetings 

Along with the tour, BigBang held a special event with their fans, under the name BigBang Special Event - Hajimari No Sayonara, with seven shows in Japan and one show in South Korea.

Set lists

Dates

Personnel

Lead performer
Vocals, dance and director: Big Bang (G-Dragon, T.O.P, Taeyang, Seungri and Daesung)

Band
Music director/Keyboard 1: Gil Smith II
AMD/Bass: Omar Dominick
Drums: Bennie Rodgers II
Keyboard 2: Dante Jackson
Guitar: Justin Lyons
Pro Tools Programmer: Adrian "AP" Porter

Dancers
HI-TECH: Park Jung Heon, Jung Byoung Gon, Kwon Young Deuk, Kwon Young Don, Lee Young Sang, You Chung Jae,
CRAZY: Won Ah Yeon, Park Eun Young, Kim Min Jung, Kim Hee Yeon, Park Eun Chong, Kim Se Jin.

Music department, visual & concert
Concert director: BigBang, Lee Jae Wook
Live performance director: Jeung Chi Young
Choreographer director: Lee Jae Wook
Visual director, stylist: Gee Eun

DVD and Blu-ray

BIGBANG10 The Concert : 0.TO.10 In Japan

BIGBANG10 The Concert : 0.TO.10 In Japan is a live DVD & Blu-ray by the group, released on November 2, 2016 in Japan. The DVD/Blu-ray was filmed during the group final live performance in Yanmar Stadium Nagai, which attracted 55,000 fans.

The DVD includes a total of the 30 songs that were sung live in the concert of 0.TO.10, including a multi angle camera for each member, a special features section, behind the scenes of the tour, and a collection of best stages. The DVD also contains the movie Made that was released in cinemas on 30 June 2016, including special interviews that have been cut from the film.

Track listing

Charts
BIGBANG10 The Concert : 0.TO.10 In Japan charted 1st on Oricon Daily Chart upon its release. In the first week it debuted at number one on the Oricon DVD Chart, selling 35,553 copies, making it fifth DVD released by the group to debut at number-one in Japan. The Blu-ray edition also debuted at number one and became the fifth Blu-ray to top Oricon Blu-ray Chart, selling 15,218 copies in the first week.

Sales

BIGBANG10 The Concert : 0.TO.10 In Seoul
BIGBANG10 The Concert : 0.TO.10 In Seoul is a live DVD by the group, released on February 8, 2017 in Japan, and February 10 in South Korea. The DVD was filmed during the group 10th anniversary concert on August 20, 2016 in Seoul World Cup Stadium, which attracted 65,000 fans, and became the biggest audience gathered for a solo concert in the South Korea.

The DVD includes a total of the 30 songs that were sung live in the concert of 0.TO.10, including a multi angle camera for each member for five songs.

Track listing

BIGBANG10 The Concert : 0.TO.10 -The Final-
BIGBANG10 The Concert : 0.TO.10 -The Final- is a live DVD and Blu-ray by the group, released on March 22, 2017 in Japan. The DVD/Blu-ray was filmed during the group final live performance in Japan at Kyocera Dome. The tour in Japan mobilized 781,500 people in 16 shows in four cities.

The DVD/Blu-ray includes a documentary film about the tour final, special features, collection of best moments, and the fan-meeting special event "HAJIMARI NO SAYONARA".

Track listing

Gallery

References

External links
Official Site
YG Entertainment
Big Bang Japan Official Site

2016 concert tours
2017 concert tours
BigBang (South Korean band) concert tours
Concert tours of Asia
Concert tours of Japan